Hetmans of the Polish–Lithuanian Commonwealth were the highest-ranking military officers, second only to the King, in the Polish–Lithuanian Commonwealth. The first Polish title of Grand Crown Hetman was created in 1505. The title of hetman was given to the leader of the Polish Army and until 1581 it was awarded only for a specific campaign or war. Later it became a permanent title, as did all the titles in the Kingdom of Poland and Polish–Lithuanian Commonwealth. It could not be revoked unless treachery had been proven (from 1585). Hetmans were not paid for their services by the Royal Treasury.

Field and Great Hetmans
From the end of 16th century there were two hetmans in the Grand Duchy of Lithuania and two hetmans in the Crown: a Field Hetman and a Great Hetman (sometimes translated as Grand Hetman). As a result, there were in total four hetman titles: Great Crown Hetman, Field Crown Hetman, Great Lithuanian Hetman and Field Lithuanian Hetman. During joint military operations of the Crown and Grand Duchy of Lithuania armies, the Grand Crown Hetman usually was considered superior to others hetmans and served as commander-in-chief if the war actions ran along the borders of the Grand Duchy and vice versa.

Grand Hetmans were usually in command of the professional and mobilised army and during peace stayed at the capital involving themselves in politics, guarding the interests of the army and planning campaigns.

Polish Field Hetman was subordinates of Grand Hetman and when on the same battlefield commanded the mercenaries and artillery. During peace they usually were deployed on the eastern and southern borders of the Commonwealth, and commanded all local forces against constant skirmishes and small invasions of the Ottoman Empire and its vassals. Field Hetman were also called Frontier Hetman, since they did the same job as commanders of frontier garrisons before the title of hetman was introduced.

Lithuanian Field Hetman initially was called Court Hetman and commanded the guard of the Grand Duke, while Land Hetman commanded militia. Later this difference disappeared and they were renamed Field and Great Hetmans accordingly. Contrary to Polish practice Lithuanian Field Hetman had full control on army under his command and wasn't subordinated to the Great Hetman.

For a short period there was also an office of Royal Court Hetman, but it never gained much influence.

Responsibilities and privileges
Hetman's competences and privileges, first officially described in 1527 in the act of nomination for Jan Tarnowski included:
 planning and carrying out of military campaigns
 enlistment and organisation of professional army (wojsko kwarciane) and mercenaries
 supervision of registered Cossacks and atamans, who were chosen by hetmans for two-year terms
 nomination and promotion of officers at will
 choosing locations where the army units were to draw supplies from (that could become a severe burden of cities/nobles that were disliked by a hetman)
 supervising the flow of the army's finances (including the soldiers' wages)
 full control over military judiciary (with capital punishment during wars), they could also issue laws and regulations for the army (known as hetman's articles)
 hearing complaints of all civilian personnel against the army and issuing compensation
 hetmans had certain competencies in foreign policy, they could send their own emissaries to countries such as the Ottoman Empire, Moldavia, Crimean Khanate and Wallachia. It was reasoned that the distance to capital was too large and situation in that regions was always too volatile for all decisions to be made in the capital (Kraków, later Warsaw)

The hetman had no right to order the forces of the royal court, the royal guard, units equipped by the cities and towns, or private individuals, although during wars those units often voluntarily pledged their obedience to hetmans. Hetmans had no control over the navy, although the Polish Navy was always of very limited importance. Hetmans usually had no direct control over the levy (pospolite ruszenie), but they could give orders to the regimentars who commanded it.

While hetmans were considered to be among the highest-ranking officials in the Polish–Lithuanian Commonwealth, their hetman status gave them no right to sit in either the Senate or Sejm, unless they held another office that automatically carried with it a seat or were elected as a representatives of local szlachta during sejmiks. Each hetman received a hetman's ceremonial mace, the bulawa, as the symbol of his position (it was added to his coat of arms). Less common was a horse-tail ensign and hetman's sign.

In some of the never realised plans of reconstruction of the Polish–Lithuanian Commonwealth from dual into triple state (Polish–Lithuanian–Ruthenian Commonwealth), the hetman was to be a head of the Ruthenian part, consisting of three Ukrainian voivodeships (see Treaty of Hadiach).

The reforms of 1776, stimulated by the first Partition of Poland,  limited the powers of the hetmans.

Hetman's aides
A hetman's chief aides and officers included:
 pisarz polny – field chancellor, responsible for the archives, chancery, finances, accounting of people, equipment and fortifications, and paying soldiers' wages
 straznik – guardian; security; supervised the scout forces during movement and camping and commanded the front guard (however, if both hetmans were present, the Field Hetman acted as Great Guardian (Polish: Wielki Straznik)).
 obozny – camp leader; camp and transport organisation; responsible for choosing a suitable camping place for an army, setting up the camp, logistics and security inside the encampment.
 szpitalny – medic; medical services
 profos – military juridiciary
 brabanmajster – logistics
 regimentarz – second-in-command in the event a hetman was killed or taken prisoner; the regimantrz could also be chosen by the king for a given period when a hetman was not available, or informally assumed this function of the commander-in-chief when no hetman or monarch was present nearby (for example, the commander of a  levee en masse was usually called a regimentarz.

Most of those aides also had a Field/Great and Crown/Lithuanian add-ons to their titles, depending on which hetman they were serving under.

Several new military titles were created after the 1635 by king Władysław IV Vasa, changing some of hetman's responsibilities:
1637 – General of Artillery (responsible for artillery forces, their logistics and such)
1670s – General of Logistics, General of Medics, General of Finances
The Generals of Inspections controlled the combat readiness of troops, however it is unclear when they were created (besides the phrase ‘in 17th century’).

List of Crown Hetmans

List of Hetmans of the Grand Duchy of Lithuania

See also
 Buława
 Hetman's sign
 Hetmans of Ukrainian Cossacks
 List of szlachta
 Military exemptions
 Offices in the Polish–Lithuanian Commonwealth

References

Bibliography
 Polskie tradycje wojskowe.. Warszawa: Wydawnictwo Ministerstwa Obrony Narodowej, 1990. 
 Zdzisław Żygulski, Hetmani Rzeczypospolitej, Kraków 1994
 Poczet hetmanów Rzeczypospolitej. Hetmani koronni. Pod redakcją Mirosława Nagielskiego, Warszawa 2005
 Poczet hetmanów Rzeczypospolitej. Hetmani litewscy. Pod redakcją Mirosława Nagielskiego, Warszawa 2006
 Urzędnicy centralni i nadworni Polski XIV-XVIII wieku. Spisy, Wyd. PAN, Kórnik 1992

 
Military personnel of the Polish–Lithuanian Commonwealth
Lithuanian titles
Polish landowners
Lists of office-holders in Poland
1505 establishments in Europe

lt:Lietuvos didysis etmonas